Amir Ali Khan Bahadur was the Nawab of the Malerkotla State from 1821 to 1846.

References

Nawabs of Malerkotla

1846 deaths

Year of birth unknown